Chicken and Guns is a restaurant in Portland, Oregon.

Description
Chicken and Guns is a food cart at Cartopia, located in southeast Portland's Buckman neighborhood. The business specializes in grilled chicken with Latin spices. The "guns" are baked then fried potatoes, rubbed with lemon and oil and drizzled with aji sauce.

History
The restaurant group Title Bout partnered with Chicken and Guns in 2017, and planned to open five locations over five years. The restaurant used approximately 750 whole chickens per week, as of 2017.

In 2017, Chicken and Guns was featured on the fifth season of the food reality television series Man v. Food.

In 2018, co-owner Dustin Knox was placed on leave after asking an African-American patron to leave for "loitering", leading to the restaurant being accused of racism and receiving numerous negative reviews.

Reception
Chicken and Guns was named a food cart of the year by Willamette Week in 2016. The business also ranked among Portland's top 40 food carts, based on Yelp review data, in 2016. Pete Cottell included Chicken and Guns in Thrillist's 2018 list of the city's "most delicious" food carts.

Krista Garcia included Chicken and Guns in Eater Portland 2021 list of "10 Chicken-and-Jojo Champs in Portland", writing, "With wood-fired whole birds and dips like chimichurri and habanero carrot sauce, this Hawthorne food cart doesn’t exactly do traditional chicken and jojos. But the 'guns' in question, crispy potatoes, seasoned with lemon and sea salt, and served with pickled onions and creamy Peruvian aji sauce, are a welcome alternative to the usual."

See also

 List of chicken restaurants

References

External links

 
 Chicken and Guns at Zomato

Year of establishment missing
Buckman, Portland, Oregon
Food carts in Portland, Oregon
Poultry restaurants